Thaur is a municipality in the district of Innsbruck-Land in the Austrian state of Tyrol located 5 km east of Innsbruck between Rum, Austria and Hall in Tirol.

Settlement of the area probably began around 1000 BC but the location was mentioned as “Taurane” for the first time in 827. Thaur is very religious even nowadays.

Population

References

External links

 Municipality Thaur: Official website of the municipality in the Hall-Wattens region

Cities and towns in Innsbruck-Land District